Ashley B. Trantham (born November 30, 1973) is an American politician. She is a member of the South Carolina House of Representatives from the 28th District, serving since 2018. She is a member of the Republican Party.

Trantham is a member of the South Carolina Freedom Caucus.  She also serves on the House Agriculture, Natural Resources & Environmental Affairs Committee.

In 2023, Trantham was one of 21 Republican co-sponsors of the South Carolina Prenatal Equal Protection Act of 2023, which would make women who had abortions eligible for the death penalty.

References

Living people
1973 births
Republican Party members of the South Carolina House of Representatives
Women state legislators in South Carolina
21st-century American politicians
21st-century American women politicians
People from Greer, South Carolina